Parts in the Post is a compilation of remix work done by Plaid.  It also contains new and rare tracks by Plaid.

Disc one
Björk – "All Is Full of Love" 4:18
Tao – "Riot in Lagos" 5:08
Ebz – "Malawi Gold" 6:02
Sieg Uber Die Sonne – "You'll Never Come Back" 5:41
Reflection – "Spiral Bits" 4:08
Koolaking – "One Latin" 4:53
Gregory Fleckner – "Juicy Jazz Girls" 7:42
Studio Pressure – "Relics" 7:10
Grandmaster Flash & the Furious Five – "Scorpio" 4:57
Nicolette – "No Government" 6:34

Disc two
Plaid – "Wrong Ways" 5:48
Unkle – "Coffeehouse Conversation" 5:22
Nicolette – "Wholesome" 4:40
Goldfrapp – "Utopia" 4:42
Funki Porcini – "King Ashabanapal" 7:00
Dropshadow – "Disease Fototienda" 6:32
Sensorama – "Zone 30" 6:58
Herbert – "Foreign Bodies" 5:14
Jung Collective – "Street Preacher" 5:11
Coba – "After Dinner" 4:58

Plaid (band) albums
2003 remix albums
Warp (record label) remix albums